Pak Sha Chau is the name of two islands off Hong Kong:

 Pak Sha Chau (North District), or Round Island, in the North District
 Pak Sha Chau (Sai Kung District), or White Sand Island, in the Sai Kung District